Strange Meeting may refer to:

 Strange Meeting (novel), by Susan Hill
 Strange Meeting (poem), by Wilfred Owen

See also
Strange Meetings, a non-fiction book by Harry Ricketts